The ngombi is a traditional musical instrument from Central Africa.

History 
It is an arched harp.

Countries 

 Central African Republic
 Equatorial Guinea
 Republic of Congo
 Gabon

References 

Plucked string instruments
Gabonese musical instruments
Democratic Republic of the Congo musical instruments
Arched harps